"I Could Be the One" is a song by Swedish DJ Avicii and Dutch DJ Nicky Romero, which features uncredited vocals from Swedish singer Noonie Bao. The song was released as a digital download in Sweden and the Netherlands on December 26, 2012. It peaked at number three on the Swedish Singles Chart. Internationally, the single topped the charts in Hungary and the United Kingdom, peaked within the top 10 in Australia, Belgium, the Czech Republic, Denmark, Finland, the Netherlands, Norway and the Republic of Ireland and the top 20 of the charts in Austria and New Zealand.

Background and release
Before its official release, the track had been undergoing various name changes. Initially without a title, it was first played by Avicii at the Super Glow event in DC Armory, Washington, USA on November 18, 2011. It was later given the working title "Nicktim", which is a combination of both producers' first names (Nick Rotteveel and Tim Bergling). The instrumental track contained a sample from "D.A.N.C.E." by Justice, which was later removed in the final version.

A year later, a vocal version of the track was premiered on November 4, 2012 through Avicii's "LE7ELS" podcast, as well as on Nicky Romero's podcast "Protocol Radio" a week later. After fully mastering the track, they settled on using the track name "I Could Be the One (Nicktim)" while the artists are stated as Avicii vs Nicky Romero.

In 2017, the track's vocalist and songwriter Noonie Bao revealed to Spotify that despite working on the track, as well as another one on his 2013 album True, she had never actually met Avicii until a number of years later.

Critical reception
Robert Copsey of Digital Spy gave the song a mixed-to-positive review, stating:
The person in question is Dutch house producer Nicky Romero, a man who is slightly better acquainted with the current crop of mainstream club poppers, including Calvin Harris, David Guetta and Bingo Players. As such, "I Could Be the One" is a battle between Balearic-style EDM and squiggly, chart-friendly breakdowns that hit all the right places. The result, predictably, is a peaceful truce. .

Commercial performance
"I Could Be the One" peaked at number three on the Swedish Singles Chart. The single also saw massive success worldwide, particularly in the United Kingdom, where the single entered at number one on the UK Singles Chart on February 17, 2013 ― for the week ending dated February 23, 2013 ― becoming both Avicii and Nicky Romero's first chart-topping single in Britain. On the UK Dance Chart, "I Could Be the One" debuted at number one ahead of Baauer's "Harlem Shake", which entered the chart at number three.

Music video
A music video to accompany the release of "I Could Be the One" was first released onto YouTube on December 24, 2012 at a total length of 4 minutes and 46 seconds. It was directed by Peter Huang and won first prize for non-European music video at the Young Director Award 2013 in Cannes.

The video stars Inessa Frantowski as a woman who works in an office. Simu Liu also appears as one of her coworkers. She clearly hates her job, her morning routine and her colleagues' attitudes. Next, she is seen waking up in a room next to a used condom and a man in bed with her. When she opens the doors in her room, it reveals a balcony with a view of a beautiful beach. She finds a "To-Do List" in the room, with the only 'job' being to "not give a fuck". Then there are several shots of her enjoying herself: walking down a beach destroying a little girl's sandcastle (while giving her the finger), eating a selection of foods in a restaurant before kissing the waiter and dancing in a club with a man before having sex with him on a yacht. She then wakes up in her own apartment, and all is revealed to be a dream. She sees a therapist, who does nothing but prescribes her "more pills". Back in her office, she sits at her desk listening to her colleagues' mundane conversations. Finally, she loses it and begins to wreck the office, throwing her paperwork around, destroying a fax machine, insulting and assaulting some of her colleagues before fleeing the office. Bursting out the office door, the final scene shows her on her phone, booking a one-way ticket to Barbados. As she runs across the road to her car, she is hit by a delivery van which is labelled 2Late. It is unknown whether she survives.

Track listings

Credits and personnel
 Producers – Avicii, Nicky Romero, Ash Pournouri
 Lyrics – Linus Wiklund, Noonie Bao, Måns Wredenberg
 Vocals – Noonie Bao
 Label – Universal Music Group

Charts

Weekly charts

Year-end charts

Certifications

Release history

See also
 List of number-one dance singles of 2013 (U.S.)

References

2012 singles
2012 songs
Avicii songs
Nicky Romero songs
Universal Music Group singles
UK Singles Chart number-one singles
Number-one singles in Poland
Number-one singles in Scotland
Song recordings produced by Avicii
Songs written by Nicky Romero
Songs written by Arash Pournouri
Songs written by Noonie Bao
Songs written by Linus Wiklund
Songs written by Avicii